The Antalya Challenger is a professional tennis tournament played on clay courts. It is currently part of the ATP Challenger Tour. It is held annually in Antalya, Turkey since 2021.

Past finals

Singles

Doubles

References

ATP Challenger Tour
Clay court tennis tournaments
Tennis tournaments in Turkey
Sports competitions in Antalya
2021 establishments in Turkey
Recurring sporting events established in 2021